The 2002 UCI Track Cycling World Championships were the World Championship for track cycling. They took place in Ballerup, Denmark from September 25 to September 29, 2002.

Medal table

Medal summary

External links
World Track Championships - CM Copenhagen, Denmark, September 25-29, 2002 at Cycling News

 
Uci Track Cycling World Championships, 2002
Track cycling
UCI Track Cycling World Championships by year
International cycle races hosted by Denmark
UCI Track Cycling World Championships